Commonwealth is the eleventh studio album by Canadian rock band Sloan.

Concept and release
In 2013, the band revealed plans for a double album, with each of the four sides featuring a solo suite by a different band member. In May 2014, it was announced that the new album would be titled Commonwealth and would be released in September 2014. On July 14, 2014, the band announced the official release date for the album (September 9) and released the album's lead single, "Keep Swinging (Downtown)". The album's cover was simultaneously released, which portrays the band members as four-of-a-kind kings. The suits of these playing cards correspond to the titles of their solo sides: Jay Ferguson's side is called Diamonds, Chris Murphy's is Hearts, Patrick Pentland's is Clubs, and Andrew Scott's is Spades.

Track listing

Each suite is written and performed by its respective band member.

References

2014 albums
Sloan (band) albums